Mohammad Foyez Ullah is a Bangladeshi architect.  He is the founder and principal architect of Volumezero Limited, and was the co-founder of Vistaara Architects. He started his career as an educator and taught as an assistant professor at the Department of Architecture, BUET from 1994 until 1998. 

Eventually he moved towards professional architectural practice as a designer and an entrepreneur in related fields.

Early life, education and career 

Mohammad Foyez Ullah was born on 1 January 1967 in Dhaka, Bangladesh, to AKM Woliullah, a government service holder and entrepreneur, and Sultana Begum, a homemaker. Foyez received his Bachelor of Architecture degree in 1993 and Masters of Architecture degree in 1997 from the Bangladesh University of Engineering and Technology. Soon after graduation in 1993, he married his fiancé, Morsheda Nasmeen, who formerly worked for BRAC until 1995 and later on joined and co-founded the same enterprises as Foyez. They have 2 children together. In the following year of 1994, he went back to the same institute (BUET) and taught there until 1998. He continued to be an educator in architectural schools across the country from BRAC University, North South University, Chittagong University of Engineering and Technology, Ahsanullah University of Science and Technology to University of Asia Pacific.

Foyez co-founded Vistaara Architects in 1994 and after more than a decade of partnership with Vistaara, he founded  Volumezero Limited in 2008. His early designed projects includes Bashundhara City, which was the largest mall in South Asia and 3rd largest in the world when it was opened to the public on 6 August 2003 and is still one of the largest shopping malls in South Asia. It was a mixed-use retail development and has been received the Superbrand status in 2009. More of his early projects are, UTC, The Westin Dhaka, PICL Bhaban and Shanta Western Tower, Grameenphone Corporate Headquarters, (GP House).

Foyez has also known as a Green Building designer. U.S. Green Building Council's has accredited LEED Gold certification to various projects designed and built by Foyez's practice such as Simpletree Anarkali, Shahjalal Islami Bank Corp, Headquarters, and Simpletree Lighthouse. Foyez is an editorial committee member of the Fire Safety and Protection section of Bangladesh National Building Code (BNBC). He is also an advisor of the monthly showcase, which is an art and architecture magazines of Bangladesh.

Books 

 "FOYEZ ULLAH DHAKA’S TROPICAL EXPRESSIVE ARCHITECTURE", a book by Oscar Riera Ojeda Publishers, this book shows how Foyez's architecture has contributed to the society and people.

Early projects

Bashundhara City 
The mall Bashundhara City is located at Panthapath, Dhaka, and was opened to the public on 6 August 2004. The building complex is 19 stories tall and covers an area of 17,763 square meter. It is one of the largest shopping malls in South Asia. The mall has space for 2,325 retail stores and cafeterias, gymnasium, a cinema hall, a penthouse food court, an ice skating rink, a theme park, a fitness club, and a swimming pool. It also includes the 19-story corporate offices of the Bashundhara Group.

Grameenphone Corporate Headquarters 
Grameenphone's corporate headquarters (known as "GP House") is located at Bashundhara R/A, Dhaka and was formally inaugurated on 23 November 2010. GP House is considered as one of the most successful office buildings in Bangladesh.

The Westin Dhaka 
The Westin Dhaka is a Westin Hotel located at Gulshan Avenue in Dhaka. It is one of the tallest hotel in Bangladesh. It has 29 floors, and was completed in 2006.

Major projects (2008–present)

Bashundhara Sports Complex 
Sports complex including football stadium of Bashundhara Kings Arena. It is the largest Sports Complex in Bangladesh, a total land area of 300 bigha (100 acre).

Simpletree Lighthouse 
Simpletree Lighthouse is a 14-storied commercial building. It has been certified by LEED Gold on July 12, 2021, for core and shell.

Mika Cornerstone 
Mika Cornerstone. Complexation 2015. Located in Uttara Dhaka, it is one of the tallest building in Uttara.

Akij House 
Akij House is the headquarter of one of the largest Bangladeshi industrial conglomerates. It is located beside Tejgaon Gulshan Link Road. The design goal for the Akij House was to create an architectural piece that would reflect Akij Group's corporate vision.

Sheraton Dhaka 
A hotel by Marriott International which is located in Dhaka, The architectural expression of Sheraton Dhaka is borne out of Omni directionality. As a visual datum along the commercial spine the edifice would command visual importance and truly emerge as an iconic landmark in this city.

Shahjalal Islami Bank Corp. Headquarters 
It is the head-office of this bank. This building was LEED Gold certified on February 6, 2019.

Simpletree Anarkali 
This project is the first LEED certified core & shell project in Bangladesh. It stands 14 stories above ground with three basement levels and 143,189 square feet of gross usable spaces. In terms of energy consumption the building system achieves 12.57 percent reduction in energy cost.

ICCB Bashundhara 
Widely known as ICCB, it is the largest event space in Bangladesh, which is owned by Bashundhara Group.

Awards 
 Four National Board of Revenue (NBR) Awards to being listed as the highest tax-paying architect in Bangladesh from 2018, 2019, 2020 and 2021.
 Bangladesh Television National TV Debate Champion, represented Suhrawardy Hall Debate Team, BUET, 1990.
 Ahsanur Rahman Gold Medal for the Masters of Architecture, from BUET in 1997.
 IAB Design Award for design excellence in Multi-Family Housing,1998.
 Citation Award-winning entry, organized by IAB and PICL Authority in 1998.
 Berger Excellence in Architecture Award for designing Peoples Insurance Bhaban, 2007.
 Global Brand Excellence Award, 2007.
 Honourable Mention for Designing Liberation War Museum, Dhaka, November 2009.
 Holcim Green Built Award for designing Grameenphone Corporate Headquarter (GPHouse), 2010.

References

External links
Official Site






Living people
Bangladeshi architects
Bangladesh University of Engineering and Technology alumni
1967 births
21st-century Bangladeshi architects